Kevin Heffernan (born May 25, 1968) is an American actor, writer, producer, and director, and member of the Broken Lizard comedy group.

Life and career

Heffernan was born in West Haven, Connecticut. His mother, Catheryn Jane (née Eiby), is the West Haven treasurer, and his father, Eugene Michael Heffernan, worked as a probate judge. His paternal grandfather, William J. Heffernan, was mayor of West Haven.

Heffernan is a graduate of Fairfield College Preparatory School and later Colgate University, the latter where he was a part of comedy group Charred Goosebeak with other members of the Beta Theta Pi fraternity. This group would stay together outside college, and become the group Broken Lizard. Heffernan is a graduate of Brooklyn Law School, and passed the Connecticut bar exam, but does not practice law. 

Instead, he and the other members of Broken Lizard spent several years to make the film Super Troopers. They took it to the Sundance Film Festival, and sold the distribution rights to Fox Searchlight Pictures for $3.25 million. It grossed $23.1 million when released in 2001, and Heffernan's comedy acting career was made. Heffernan is best known for his role of Vermont State Trooper Rod Farva in Super Troopers and its 2018 sequel Super Troopers 2.

He works especially closely with fellow Broken Lizard member Steve Lemme. They do a two-man touring standup comedy show, a podcast, a web series, and a Netflix special.

Heffernan also played Landfill and Gil in Beerfest, and co-starred in the Dukes of Hazzard film as "Sheev".

He has also appeared on How I Met Your Mother (ep. "I'm Not That Guy"), Curb Your Enthusiasm, Veep, Arrested Development, Agent Carter, and in two episodes of season 5 of The Goldbergs, as Ms.Torg's favorite "chalk throwing" teacher.

Currently, he stars as Chief Terry McConky in the TruTV cable television firefighter comedy series Tacoma FD. This series launched in March 2019, and is partly based on the stories of Heffernan's cousin William "Bill" Heffernan, who is the historian for the West Haven Fire Department, and a consultant for the program.

Filmography
 Puddle Cruiser (1996) – Grogan (with Broken Lizard)
 No Looking Back (1998) – Guy In Diner #1
 Big Helium Dog (1999) – Phil
 Super Troopers (2001) – Rod Farva (with Broken Lizard)
 Reel Comedy: Super Troopers (2002) – Rod Farva (with Broken Lizard)
 Club Dread (2004) – Lars (with Broken Lizard)
 The 100 Scariest Movie Moments (2004) - Himself
 The Dukes of Hazzard (2005) – Sheev
 Sky High (2005) – Ron Wilson, Bus Driver
 Preaching to the Choir (2005) – Amish Man (also screenwriter)
 Beerfest (2006) – Landfill/Gil/Sausage Lady (with Broken Lizard)
 Strange Wilderness (2008) – Whitaker
 The RJ Danko Story (2008) – Weber
 The Slammin' Salmon (2009) – Rich Ferente; also his debut as director (with Broken Lizard)
 The Babymakers (2012) - Wade
 Super Troopers 2 (2018) - Rod Farva (with Broken Lizard)
 Scoob! (2020) - Bike Cop Gary (voice debut)

Television
 2007: Curb Your Enthusiasm - Episode: The TiVo Guy
 2007: How I Met Your Mother - Episode: I'm Not That Guy
 2014: Workaholics - Episode: DeputyDong
 2015: Agent Carter - Episode: "Now is Not the End"
 2016: Time Traveling Bong - Episode: Chapter 1: The Beginning
 2017: The Goldbergs - Episodes: Hogan Is My Grandfather and We Didn't Start the Fire.
2019: Tacoma FD - "Chief Terry McConky" and Executive Producer

References

External links
 

1968 births
20th-century American male actors
21st-century American male actors
Film directors from Connecticut
Male actors from Connecticut
American male comedians
21st-century American comedians
American male film actors
Broken Lizard
Colgate University alumni
Brooklyn Law School alumni
Living people
People from West Haven, Connecticut
Fairfield College Preparatory School alumni